Joe Selenski (born   1955) is a former minor league hockey coach and general manager.

Atlantic Coast Hockey League
Selenski got his start as a coach and general manager with the Troy Slapshots of the Atlantic Coast Hockey League. The Slapshots would see limited action in the ACHL, playing only six games before being suspended by ACHL Commissioner Ray Miron. Shortly after the leaguewide dispersal draft, the Mohawk Valley Comets would fire their coach (Bill Horton) and replace him with Selenski, who assumed the dual role of coach and general manager. The Comets would go 22-22-3 under Selenski and make the playoffs. However, the Comets would eventually lose to the Virginia Lancers four games to three in the Payne Trophy Finals. After the completion of the 1986-87 ACHL season, the Comets transferred to the AHL and were later rebranded as the Utica Devils, and the ACHL was folded by Commissioner Ray Miron.

All-American Hockey League
Without a team to coach at the start of the 1987-88 season, Selenski headed to Johnstown to negotiate the foundation of a hockey team in the newly formed All-American Hockey League. On December 27, 1987, Selenski - along with future team owner Henry Brabham - walked into Dennis Grenell's office at the Cambria County War Memorial Arena and inquired about potentially putting a new franchise in Johnstown. Selenski expected to be able to field team by the start of the following season, but Grenell said he wanted a team "right now". Within two weeks, Selenski was able to find uniforms from a Canadian vendor and field a team based on old players who he had coached while in the ACHL. The Chiefs went 13-13-0 in the regular season and qualified for the playoffs, but would eventually lose to the Carolina Thunderbirds. Selenski was not re-signed after the post-season.

ECHL
Selenski was brought in as a midseason replacement for Carolina Thunderbirds' head coach Brian Carroll. Despite finishing with a sub-.500 record, Selenski would lead the Thunderbirds to the playoffs and would eventually defeat the Johnstown Chiefs in a seven-game Riley Cup Final.

While in Carolina, Selenski coached several players who would reach the NHL in various capacities. Forward Bill Huard would later go on to play over 200 games in the NHL with five different teams. Scott Allen would later coach in the ECHL and AHL for 13 years before assuming the position of Assistant Coach for the New York Islanders at the start of the 2010-11 NHL season. Goaltender Toby O'Brien would later become a scout supervisor for the New York Islanders' affiliates in Bridgeport and Utah. Allen and O'Brien would also go on to coach the Johnstown Chiefs, a team that Selenski coached during the team's inaugural 1987-88 season.

References

External links

Johnstown Chiefs coaches
1955 births
American ice hockey coaches
ECHL coaches
Living people